The Kanmantoo mine is a copper mine in the Australian state of South Australia located near the town of Kanmantoo about  southeast of the state capital of Adelaide.

History
Copper was first discovered and mined in the 1840s. The town was established to house workers at the mine, which at that time was an underground mine. The original mine was active from 1846 to 1874. A new open-cut mine operated from 1970 to 1976. The current mine operators acquired the mining and exploration leases in stages over 2003-2008, and started mining operations from 2011. Processing at the mine site produces concentrates which are transported by road to Port Adelaide via the South Eastern Freeway.

Geology
The mineral deposits are in Cambrian Kanmantoo group rocks.

Pumped hydroelectric energy storage
In April 2019, owners of the mine Hillgrove Resources announced that it had sold rights to build, own and operate a pumped hydroelectric energy storage facility in the open pit. The buyer was AGL Energy. If all the relevant government approvals were received, it was expected that the system could have been operational in 2024. The project was dropped by mutual agreement early in 2020.

References

Adelaide Hills
Copper mines in South Australia